Rodney Gnat (born March 16, 1987) is an arena football defensive end who is currently retired. Gnat played collegiately at Louisville. Currently the head football coach at Wolfson high school (Jacksonville.Fl)

Professional career

Iowa Barnstomers
After not hearing his name called at the 2011 NFL Draft, Gnat signed with the Iowa Barnstormers of the Arena Football League. Gnat returned to the Barnstormers for the 2013 season.

Sioux Fall Storm
In March 2014, Gnat signed with the Sioux Falls Storm of the Indoor Football League (IFL). He was released on March 27, 2014.

Omaha Beef
On April 28, 2014, Gnat was released by the Omaha Beef of the Champions Professional Indoor Football League (CPIFL).

Green Bay Blizzard
On April 30, 2014, Gnat signed with the Green Bay Blizzard.

Columbus Lions
On May 27, 2014, Gnat signed with the Columbus Lions of the Professional Indoor Football League (PIFL).

Colorado Crush
Gnat was released on March 10, 2016.

Wichita Falls Nighthawks
On March 14, 2016, Gnat signed with the Wichita Falls Nighthawks. On June 28, 2016, Gnat was released.

Jacksonville Sharks
On January 19, 2017, Gnat signed with the Jacksonville Sharks.

References

1987 births
Living people
Louisville Cardinals football players
Iowa Barnstormers players
Sioux Falls Storm players
Omaha Beef players
Green Bay Blizzard players
Columbus Lions players
Wichita Falls Nighthawks players
Colorado Crush (IFL) players
Jacksonville Sharks players